Jocelyn Hunt (born 1994) is a British artistic gymnast. As a member of the England team she won the silver medal in the team all-around event at the 2010 Commonwealth Games.

Gymnast
Hunt was part of the England Team at the 2010 Commonwealth Games in India where they were placed second. In the same year shea also won the silver medal in the team all-around event at the 2010 European Women's Artistic Gymnastics Championships in Birmingham, England.

Retirement
Hunt retired from competitive gymnastics in 2013 after a career of 12 years. She planned to go to University of Chichester to study sports psychology.

References

1994 births
Living people
British female artistic gymnasts
Place of birth missing (living people)
Gymnasts at the 2010 Commonwealth Games
Commonwealth Games silver medallists for England
Commonwealth Games medallists in gymnastics
21st-century British women
Medallists at the 2010 Commonwealth Games